Kazem Khani-ye Sofla (also Romanized as Kāz̧em Khānī-ye Soflá; also known as Hārbar) is a village in Heydariyeh Rural District, Govar District, Gilan-e Gharb County, Kermanshah Province, Iran. At the 2006 census, its population was 277, in 56 families.

References 

Populated places in Gilan-e Gharb County